Leckrone is an unincorporated community in Fayette County, Pennsylvania, United States. Leckrone has a post office, with ZIP code 15454.

History

The most well-known industry in Leckrone was mining and coke ovens. Construction was begun in mid-1899 and the first coke was drawn on June 2, 1900. The plants were serviced by a spur of the Smithfield and Masontown Branch of the Baltimore and Ohio Railroad, which opened on April 7, 1900. As of 1901, Leckrone No. 1 Mine had 525 acres of coal and 250 coke ovens, while the No. 2 Mine had 300 acres of coal tributary and 150 ovens.

References

Unincorporated communities in Fayette County, Pennsylvania
Unincorporated communities in Pennsylvania